Kim Ji-Hun (born 3 January 1992) is a South Korean Greco-Roman wrestler who won the gold medal in the 66 kg weight division at the 2013 Asian Wrestling Championships. In the final he defeated Mehdi Zeidvand of Iran 1–0, 1–0.

References

1992 births
Living people
South Korean male sport wrestlers
21st-century South Korean people